The following lists events that happened during 1921 in New Zealand.

Incumbents

Regal and viceregal
 Head of State  – George V
 Governor-General – John Jellicoe, Viscount Jellicoe

Government
The 20th New Zealand Parliament continues, with the Reform Party in Government

Speaker of the House – Frederick Lang
Prime Minister – William Massey
Minister of Finance – William Massey
Minister of External Affairs – Ernest Lee

Parliamentary opposition
Leader of the Opposition – Thomas Wilford (Liberal Party)

Judiciary
 Chief Justice – Sir Robert Stout

Main centre leaders
Mayor of Auckland – James Gunson
Mayor of Wellington – John Luke then Robert Wright
Mayor of Christchurch – Henry Thacker
Mayor of Dunedin – William Begg then James Douglas

Events 
 31 January – The first scheduled air mail service in New Zealand commences, linking Christchurch with Ashburton and Timaru.
 17 November – The first radio broadcast in New Zealand is made by Professor Robert Jack from the physics department of the University of Otago.

Arts and literature

See 1921 in art, 1921 in literature, :Category:1921 books

Music

See: 1921 in music

Radio

 17 November – Professor Robert Jack assembles a small transmitter at the University of Otago in Dunedin and broadcasts the first ever radio programme heard on New Zealand airwaves. The only known fact about the programme's content is that it included the then popular song "Hello My Dearie".

See: Public broadcasting in New Zealand

Film
Beyond
The Betrayer

See: :Category:1921 film awards, 1921 in film, List of New Zealand feature films, Cinema of New Zealand, :Category:1921 films

Sport

Chess
 National champion – John Boyd Dunlop, of Dunedin (his first title)

Cricket
 Plunket Shield

Football
 Provincial league champions:
 Auckland – Northcote
 Canterbury – Corinthians
 Hawke's Bay – Waipukurau
 Nelson – Athletic
 Otago – HSOB
 Southland – Corinthians
 Wanganui – Eastown Workshops
 Wellington – Hospital

Golf
 The 11th New Zealand Open championship is won by Ted Douglas (his fourth title)
 The 25th National Amateur Championships are held in Christchurch:
 Men – A.G. Sime (Greymouth)
 Women – G. Williams (her fourth title)

Horse racing

Harness racing
 New Zealand Trotting Cup – Reta Peter (2nd win)
 Auckland Trotting Cup – Man O' War (2nd win)

Thoroughbred racing
 New Zealand Cup – Royal Star
 Auckland Cup – Malaga
 Wellington Cup – Maioha
 New Zealand Derby – Winning Hit

Lawn bowls
The national outdoor lawn bowls championships are held in Wellington.
 Men's singles champion – J.M. Brackenridge (Newtown Bowling Club)
 Men's pair champions – W.A. Grenfell, S. Potter (skip) (Wellington Bowling Club)
 Men's fours champions – B. Hilton, A. Bell, O. Gallagher, Ernie Jury (skip) (Karangahake Bowling Club)

Rugby union
 1921 South Africa rugby union tour of Australia and New Zealand
Wellington then defend it against  (27–19) and Otago (13–8).

Births

January
 9 January – Fraser Barron, World War II bomber pilot
 17 January – Jack Bergin, neurologist, anti-abortion campaigner
 30 January – Joan Faulkner-Blake, broadcaster

February
 5 February – Juan Schwanner, association football player and coach
 6 February – Bob Scott, rugby league and rugby union player
 7 February – Guy Natusch, architect
 13 February – Howard Hutchinson, association footballer
 14 February – Harry Whale, physicist
 20 February – Tom McGuigan, politician
 25 February – Keith Thiele, World War II and commercial pilot

March
 4 March – Charlie Dempsey, association football administrator
 12 March – Les Harmer, cricket umpire
 13 March – Raymond Brown Hesselyn, World War II fighter pilot
 16 March – Chip Bailey, trade unionist

April
 10 April – Robert Wade, chess player
 12 April – Peter Brown, artist
 27 April – Helen Wily, mathematician
 30 April – Wally Williams, water polo player

May
 2 May – Ron Smith, public servant, peace activist
 6 May – Tangaroa Tangaroa, Cook Islands politician
 12 May – Peter Munz, philosopher, historian
 15 May – Anne Delamere, public servant
 18 May – Rosalie Carey, playwright, director, poet, actor, author
 23 May – Richard Harrison, politician
 26 May
 Frank Mooney, cricketer
 Agnes Wood, artist, writer
 29 May – Wally Argus, rugby union player
 31 May – Aston Greathead, artist

June
 6 June – Shirley Tonkin, sudden infant death syndrome researcher
 7 June – Brian Talboys, politician
 13 June – Roy Blair, cricketer
 17 June – Monita Delamere, rugby union player, Ringatū leader, community leader
 19 June – Judy Pickard, abstract painter, librarian and advocate for women's rights
 23 June
 Cecil Holmes, film director and writer
 Leonard Willmott, soldier, security intelligence officer
 25 June – Willow Macky, songwriter
 28 June – Eric Holland, politician

July
 8 July – John Money, psychologist, sexologist, author
 11 July – Pat Perrin, potter
 12 July – Doug Dye, microbiologist
 13 July – Lester Castle, lawyer, public servant
 18 July – Ian Payne, cricketer
 21 July – Graham Speight, jurist
 23 July – Peter Gordon, politician
 26 July – June Westbury, politician
 30 July – Eric Grinstead, sinologist, Tangutologist

August
 4 August – Patricia Hook, religious sister, nurse and hospital administrator
 5 August – Colin McLeod, civil engineer
 6 August – Jack Monaghan, wrestler
 7 August – Miraka Szászy, Māori leader
 14 August
 Donald Burns, cricket umpire
 Ken Ruby, wrestler
 21 August – Doreen Lumley, athlete
 26 August – Bob Owens, businessman, politician, mayor of Tauranga (1968–77)

September
 2 September – Diana Isaac, conservationist, businesswoman, philanthropist
 3 September – Oonah Shannahan, netball player
 4 September – Bruce Biggs, Māori studies academic
 14 September – Colin Johnstone, rower
 19 September – Michael Noonan, novelist, radio and television scriptwriter 
 25 September – Robert Muldoon, politician
 28 September
 Morrie Goddard, rugby union player
 Bruce Mason, playwright
 29 September – John Ritchie, composer, orchestral founder and conductor, music academic
 30 September – Jim Macdonald, naval officer, civil engineer, inventor

October
 3 October – Eldred Stebbing, record label founder and owner
 7 October – Desmond O'Donnell, rugby union player
 9 October – Tom Marshall, Christian writer
 10 October – Harvey Sweetman, World War II pilot
 13 October – Earle Riddiford, lawyer and mountaineer 
 18 October – Kingi Ihaka, Anglican priest, broadcaster, Māori leader
 23 October – Colin Allan, colonial administrator, diplomat
 29 October – Jack Warcup, mycologist

November
 4 November – William Tyree, electrical engineer, businessman, philanthropist
 6 November – Geoff Rabone, cricketer
 8 November – Gordon Mason, local-body politician
 11 November – Buddy Corlett, softball and basketball player
 17 November – Bruce Irwin, botanist
 20 November
 Arthur Faulkner, politician
 Dick Matthews, plant virologist

December
 3 December – Cyril Belshaw, anthropologist
 8 December
 Dot McNab, military administrator, political organizer
 Bob Walton, police officer
 11 December – David Baldwin, lawn bowls player
 24 December – Vincent Bevan, rugby union player
 29 December – Ngoi Pēwhairangi, songwriter, Māori language teacher and advocate

Deaths

January–March
 19 January – Frank Lawry, politician (born 1839)
 7 February – Bella Button, horse driver and trainer, equestrian (born 1863)
 23 February – J. T. Marryat Hornsby, politician, newspaper editor and proprietor (born 1857)
 27 February – Sir James Prendergast, lawyer, politician, jurist (born 1826)
 9 March – Walter Powdrell, politician (born 1872)
 10 March – Henry Brown, saw miller, politician (born 1842)
 21 March – Samuel Moreton, artist, explorer (born 1844)

April–June
 4 April – Mary Jane Milne, milliner, businesswoman (born 1840)
 19 April – Cathcart Wason, politician (born 1848)
 23 April – William Maxwell, politician (born 1867)
 1 June – Tureiti Te Heuheu, Ngāti Tūwharetoa leader, politician (born 1865)
 24 June – William Dickie, politician (born 1869)
 25 June – Haimona Patete, Ngāti Koata and Ngāti Kuia leader, religious founder (born 1863)

July–September
 19 July – Lily Atkinson, temperance campaigner, suffragist, feminist (born 1866)
 31 July – Alice Jacob, botanical illustrator, lace designer, design teacher (born 1862)
 13 August – Otene Pitau, Rongowhakaata leader (born 1834)
 5 August – Robert Kirkpatrick Simpson, politician (born 1837)
 17 August – John Aitken, politician, mayor of Wellington (1900–05) (born 1849)
 9 September – Joseph Henry Cock, shipping company manager, patron of the arts (born 1855)
 17 September – John Verrall, photographer, politician (born 1849)
 20 September – Thomas Kelly, politician (born 1830)

October–December
 29 October – Samuel Nevill, Anglican bishop (born 1837)
 31 October – James Little, shepherd, sheep breeder (born 1834)
 1 November
 Jeremiah Twomey, journalist, politician (born 1847)
 29 November – Hopere Uru, rugby union player, cricketer, politician (born 1868)
 2 December – Patrick Nerheny, politician (born 1858)

See also
List of years in New Zealand
History of New Zealand
Military history of New Zealand
Timeline of New Zealand history
Timeline of New Zealand's links with Antarctica
Timeline of the New Zealand environment

References

External links

 
Years of the 20th century in New Zealand